Pleoseptum is a genus of fungi in the family Phaeosphaeriaceae. This is a monotypic genus, containing the single species Pleoseptum yuccaesedum.

References

Pleosporales
Monotypic Dothideomycetes genera
Taxa described in 1995